AV Festival is an international festival of contemporary art, film and music, based in Newcastle upon Tyne. A biennial event, the Festival is thematically curated across contemporary artistic practice and wider society.

History

AV Festival 2014: Extraction 
AV Festival 2014: Extraction ran from 1 – 31 March 2014. The curated programme featured 11 exhibitions, 36 film screenings, 10 concerts and 11 new commissions.

Highlights of the Festival included newly commissioned art works, sound walk and performances by Akio Suzuki, new commissions by Susan Stenger and Lara Almarcegui, with weekend focuses on Digging for Sound and Post-Colonial Cinema. The closing weekend saw the music group Test Dept return with their debut event since the group disbanded in 1997. This large-scale outdoor event took place at the dramatic Dunston Staiths. Viewed from boats on the River Tyne over three nights, the event marked the 30th anniversary of the Miners’ Strike.

AV Festival 2012: As Slow As Possible 
AV Festival 2012: As Slow As Possible ran from 1–31 March 2012, and had the curatorial theme of slowness. Titled after ASLSP (As SLow aS Possible), by artist John Cage, the AV Festival 2012 theme explored how artists have stretched, measured and marked the passage of time. Some works lasted the full 31 days of the Festival.

For the first time, the Festival ran for a whole month. It took place at different speeds, paces and times of day, across Newcastle, Gateshead, Middlesbrough and Sunderland, including 22 exhibitions, 38 film screenings, 15 concerts, six walks, a 744-hour continuous online radio, plus 16 new commissions and 18 UK premieres.

AV Festival 2012 achieved 94,096 visits, a 33% increase on 2010. It attracted 24% of visitors from outside the region, contributed £516k GVA to the local economy, and achieved a return on investment of £2.88 for every £1 of public funding received. 92% of the audience rated the quality of the Festival as good or outstanding. In his Guardian article Sukhdev Sandhu described the Festival as “one of the most imaginative festivals to be staged in the UK for many years.”

Highlights of AV Festival 2012 included: new commissions by Yoshi Wada, Susan Stenger, Phill Niblock, Jonathan Schipper and Torsten Lauschmann; the closing Festival Slowalk by Hamish Fulton; a tribute concert to John Cage; Kenneth Goldsmith in Morden Tower; and public readings of On Kawara’s One Million Years.

In addition the Festival film programme focused on slowness and cinema, including special screenings with James Benning, Ben Rivers and Lav Diaz; concerts included a special tribute to Peter Christopherson; the Festival ran a 744-hour special online radio, and hundreds of people took part in a series of artist-led walks across the region.

AV Festival 2010: Energy 
AV Festival 2010: Energy ran from 5 – 14 March 2010, and had the curatorial theme of energy. The Festival explored energy as a universal force that connects, transforms and renews life. It approached the theme from a scientific, technological, environmental and spiritual perspective. New commissions included a coal-fired computer, a café importing via social networks, a film tracking the movement of the sun, and compositions based on the energy of rivers.

The Festival included 24 exhibitions, 20 performances, 15 screenings, 14 talks, 3 symposia, 2 residencies and a café. This included working with 140 artists, on 18 new commissions and 15 UK premieres, in partnership with 31 venues. Over ten days there were 70,860 visits, an increase of 65% from 2008. The Festival contributed £480k of GVA to the local economy, and achieved £1.25 of economic output per pound invested. AV Festival 2010 won a Silver Award at the North East Tourism Awards.

Highlights of AV Festival 2010 included: new commissions by Charlemagne Palestine, Graham Harwood, Kaffe Matthews, Lee Patterson and Jana Winderen; Kate Rich’s Feral Trade Café with its daily menu; exhibitions by Felix Gonzalez-Torres, Felix Hess, artificiel and Zilvinas Kempinas; and the closing night performance with Iain Sinclair, Alan Moore, Susan Stenger, FM Einheit and Stephen O’Malley. In addition the Festival included a focus on recycled film with Kenneth Anger, Craig Baldwin and Rick Prelinger, an underwater concert by Cluster, Liliane Lijn’s Power Game and a guest lecture by Gustav Metzger.

AV Festival 2008: Broadcast 
AV Festival 2008: Broadcast ran from 28 February – 8 March 2008, and had the curatorial theme of broadcast. The UK began to switch off analogue television signals in 2007, paving the way for television to become entirely digital. At the same time the internet and mobile networks have created opportunities for us to broadcast ourselves in entirely new ways. AV Festival 2008 created a catalyst for debate about the future of broadcasting, and celebrated the history of transmission.

AV Festival 2008 took place across Newcastle, Gateshead, Sunderland and Middlesbrough, and included 12 exhibitions, 37 screenings, 18 performances, 18 talks, symposia and workshops, 14 new commissions, 4 launch events and 3 radio stations. Over ten-days there were a total of 43,038 visits, a 26% increase from 2006. The Festival introduced new audiences to the work: 42% had not been to a similar event before. AV Festival 2008 won a Silver Award at the North East Tourism Awards.

Highlights of AV Festival 2008 included new commissions by Chris Watson and Marko Peljhan, the live performance of John Cage’s Variations VII, and solo exhibitions by Harun Farocki, Sonia Boyce, Staalplaat Soundsystem and Joyce Hinterding. In addition the Festival ran three FM radio stations across the region, a special tribute to the radiophonic workshop, performances by Jean-Jacques Perrey, a series of TV screenings at the cinema, and a symposia about music, sound and broadcasting technologies.

AV Festival 2006: LifeLike 
AV Festival 2006: LifeLike ran from 2 – 12 March 2006, and had the curatorial theme of life sciences. Our perceptions of what life is, when it starts and ends, and how it works have been transformed by science and technology. AV Festival 2006 featured works that show how technology can mimic, impersonate and simulate life. It also explored the way that biotechnology, genetic engineering and cloning have radically altered the way we imagine life.

AV Festival 2006 took place across Newcastle, Gateshead, Sunderland and Middlesbrough, and included 13 exhibitions, 29 screenings, 8 performances, 17 talks, symposia and workshops, 9 new commissions, and 4 launch events. Over ten days it achieved 34,142 visits, of which 88% were new audiences to the Festival. AV Festival 2006 featured the Festival's first exhibition programme with special preview evenings, including a new installation by Anthony McCall.

Highlights of AV Festival 2006 included: new commissions by Ryoji Ikeda, Michael Nyman, Gina Czarnecki, Anthony McCall and Kenneth Rinaldo; a live performance by Alva Noto (Carsten Nicolai); Suguro Goto’s robotic orchestra; and the premiere of Critical Art Ensemble’s Marching Plague. In addition there was a comprehensive film programme about how cinema has played a central role in our visions of the future, and a two-day symposium exploring life from social, scientific, technological, ethical and artistic perspectives.

AV Festival 2003: Pilot Edition  
AV Festival 2003 took place primarily in cinema spaces across the region, including the recently closed and abandoned Odeon (Paramount) Cinema on Pilgrim Street in Newcastle. Highlights included: the live performance of Man with a Movie Camera by The Cinematic Orchestra; Time Code Live with Mike Figgis; and Matthew Barney’s The Cremaster Cycle. In addition there was a Mike Figgis mini-retrospective, a series of onedotzero programmes, artist films at Cineside including Lillian Schwartz, newly commissioned Richard Fenwick films, and a live performance by Tina Frank.

References

External links
 Official web site
 The Quietus | Features | Three Songs No Flash | No More Coals From Newcastle: Test Dept At AV Festival
 Subscribe to read | Financial Times
 The AV festival: from here to eternity
 The miners' strike: digging into the past with Bill Morrison and AV festival
 'Slow cinema' fights back against Bourne's supremacy

Music festivals in Tyne and Wear
Electronic music festivals in the United Kingdom
New media art festivals
Music in Tyne and Wear